File on 4 is a current-affairs radio programme produced by BBC News and broadcast on BBC Radio 4. First broadcast from Manchester in 1977, it is produced in Salford by the BBC's Radio Current Affairs department. It has won more than forty awards, including a gold Sony Radio Award in 2003.

See also
 Face the Facts and Analysis

References

External links 
 
 Podcast Feed

BBC Radio 4 programmes
British documentary radio programmes
Investigative documentary radio programs
1977 radio programme debuts